23S rRNA pseudouridine1911/1915/1917 synthase (RluD, pseudouridine synthase RluD) is an enzyme with systematic name 23S rRNA-uridine1911/1915/1917 uracil mutase. This enzyme catalyses the following chemical reaction

 23S rRNA uridine1911/uridine1915/uridine1917  23S rRNA pseudouridine1911/pseudouridine1915/pseudouridine1917

These nucleotides are located in the functionally important helix-loop 69 of 23S rRNA.

References

External links 
 

EC 5.4.99